is a Japanese astronomer. The Minor Planet Center credits him with the co-discovery of four asteroids he made with Japanese astronomer Hiroshi Abe during 1993–1997.

The outer main-belt asteroid 3555 Miyasaka was named in his honour by prolific astronomer Takao Kobayashi, with whom Miyasaka has been collaborating for many years, acknowledging the fact, that he is one of the few Japanese observers who devote themselves to follow-up observations.

See also 
 :Category:Japanese astronomers

References 
 

1955 births
Discoverers of asteroids

20th-century Japanese astronomers
Living people